Associaçao Desportiva de Vagos is a Portuguese women's basketball club from Vagos founded in 1994. It has won the 2010 national championship plus four national cups, and it has been a regular in the FIBA Eurocup since 2009.

2011-12 Roster
 (1.87)  Flávia dos Santos
 (1.86)  Lilian Gonçalves
 (1.85)  Joana Lopes
 (1.85)  Ana Teixeira
 (1.82)  Artemis Afonso
 (1.79)  Ines Pinto
 (1.76)  Daniela Domingues
 (1.73)  Joana Jesus
 (1.70)  Ines Faustino
 (1.67)  Sara da Resurreiçao
 (1.65)  Mariana Alves
 (1.65)  Maria Pereira
 (1.62)  Carolina Anacleto

Titles
 Portuguese League
 2010
 Portuguese Cup
 2009, 2012

References

Liga Feminina de Basquetebol
Women's basketball teams in Portugal
Basketball teams established in 1994
Sport in Vagos